The San Vicente mine is a large silver mine located in Potosí Department, Bolivia. San Vicente is one of the largest silver reserves in Bolivia and in the world, containing an estimated 36.1 million ounces of silver.

References 

Silver mines in Bolivia
Mines in Potosí Department